"Imagine It Was Us" is a song recorded by British singer Jessie Ware for the re-release of her debut studio album, titled Devotion – The Gold Edition. The song was released in the United Kingdom as a digital download on 12 April 2013. The song was written by Ware, Julio Bashmore, Brey Baptista, Dave "Hyetal" Corney and James "Jimmy Napes" Napier. The song peaked at number 105 on the UK Singles Chart.

Music video
A music video to accompany the release of "Imagine It Was Us" was first released onto YouTube on 7 April 2013 at a total length of three minutes and thirty-four seconds.

Track listing

Chart performance

Weekly charts

Release history

References

2013 singles
2013 songs
Jessie Ware songs
Island Records singles
Songs written by Jimmy Napes
Songs written by Jessie Ware
Dance-pop songs